Una vacanza del cactus is a 1981 Italian commedia sexy all'italiana directed by Mariano Laurenti.

Plot 
Italy early 1980s. Mr. Zerboni (Enzo Cannavale) goes on vacation in Greece with his wife Fedora and a group of employees: Mr. Pistilli, Augusto (Bombolo) and Angela (Anna Maria Rizzoli). Misunderstandings and trouble are multiplying and while Zerboni tries to seduce Angela, his wife Messing up for his terrible myopia.

Cast 
 Anna Maria Rizzoli as Angela Marconcini
 Bombolo as Augusto Squarciarelli
 Enzo Cannavale as Giuseppe Zerboni 
 Bombolo as G. Cesare 
 Mario Brega as Uncle
 Graziella Polesinanti as Fedora
 Vincenzo Crocitti as Pistilli
 Giacomo Furia as Cavalier Pasquarelli

Release
The film was released in Italy on August 18, 1981.

See also        
 List of Italian films of 1981

References

External links

1981 films
Commedia sexy all'italiana
1980s sex comedy films
Films directed by Mariano Laurenti
Films scored by Gianni Ferrio
1981 comedy films
1980s Italian films